Keezhoote Raman Balakrishna Pillai (8 March 1935 – 3 May 2021) was an Indian politician who served as minister of the state of Kerala in India, holding portfolios such as Transport and Electricity. He was a member of the Kerala Legislative Assembly from Kottarakara constituency in Kollam district for almost three decades. He was the Chairman of Kerala Congress (B). Throughout his political career, Pillai remained a controversial figure in Kerala state politics. He was the first Kerala minister to be imprisoned for corruption.

Gandeevam, a biography of Pillai written by Vrindavanam Venugopalan with a foreword by Sooranad Kunjan Pillai, was published by Viswakeralam Daily. Pillai's autobiography was published by DC Books in 2011. He also acted in two Malayalam movies in 1979 and 1980 - Vedikkettu and Ival Oru Naadody. Prisoner 5990 is his autobiography.

Personal life
Balakrishna Pillai was born on 3 April 1935, in Valakom  near Kottarakkara in Kollam district, as the son of Keezhoote Raman Pillai and Karthyayani Amma. His father was a wealthy Nair landlord with plenty of land in the present-day Kerala and Tamil Nadu states. He was married to Vatsala and has two daughters and a son. The latter, K. B. Ganesh Kumar, is a film actor and politician who served as a state minister during 200103 and 201113. His wife Vatsalakumari died on 3 January 2018 aged 76.

Pillai died on 3 May 2021, at Vijaya hospital in Kottarakkara. He was admitted to the hospital a few days earlier owing to respiratory issues and was on ventilator support. His body was cremated with full state honours.

Political career

Student politics
R. Balakrishna Pillai was member of Thiruvathankur Students' Union (which later became Tirukochi Vidyarthi Federation and later Kerala Students' Union).

Indian National Congress
Balakrishna Pillai later joined the Indian National Congress (INC) party. In 1960, he became member of the Kerala Pradesh Congress Committee executive and of the All India Congress Committee.

He was elected to the Kerala Legislative Assembly for the first time in 1960 from the Pathanapuram Assembly Constituency of Kollam district, as an INC candidate, at the age of 25 and holds the record for becoming the youngest MLA of Kerala.

Kerala Congress formation
In 1964, fifteen MLAs led by K. M. George (including Balakrishna Pillai) left the Congress and formed a regional party called the Kerala Congress, with George as the chairman and Pillai as general secretary.
Pillai won the elections from his home constituency Kottarakara in 1965 but was defeated in the next two elections of 1967 and 1970. He was elected to the Lok Sabha in the 1971 General Election from Mavelikara constituency and served as the Member of Parliament (MP) until 1977.

From December 1975 to June 1976, he served as the Minister for Transport, Excise and Jails in the Kerala Cabinet.

Kerala Congress split
After the death of K. M. George in 1976, there was tussle for control of the party between Balakrishna Pillai and K. M. Mani. In 1977,  the party split into the Mani and Pillai groups. He was re-elected to the state legislature in 1977 and then again in the general elections of 1980, 1982, 1987, 1991, 1996, and 2001, but was defeated in the 2006 election. His victory margin of 37,000 votes in 1980 remained a record for the State Assembly polls for more than a quarter century.

He was a founder member of United Democratic Front (UDF). He was Minister for several years starting in different Ministries headed by C. Achutha Menon, K. Karunakaran, E. K. Nayanar, and A. K. Antony.

Punishment by Supreme Court

The government appointed Justice K. Sukumaran to inquire into allegations related to the Idamalayar and Kallada Dam construction projects.
Based on his report, R. Balakrishna Pillai and others were prosecuted by a Special Court.
The Supreme Court on 10 February 2011 sentenced R. Balakrishna Pillai and two others to one-year imprisonment for allegedly abusing their position in the award of a contract for the Edamalayar hydroelectric power project.
The apex court bench of Justices P. Sathasivam and B.S. Chauhan reversed the Kerala High Court judgment which had acquitted all three. Chief Minister V. S. Achuthanandan had moved the Supreme Court, in his personal capacity, challenging the verdict of acquittal and the apex court allowed Achuthanandan's appeal.

Filmography
 Mukhyamanthri
 Vedikkettu
 Ival Oru Naadody
 Neelasaree

References

1935 births
2021 deaths
Malayali politicians
Kerala politicians
People from Kollam district
India MPs 1971–1977
Lok Sabha members from Kerala
Kerala MLAs 1960–1964
Kerala MLAs 1977–1979
Kerala MLAs 1987–1991
Kerala MLAs 1996–2001
Kerala MLAs 1982–1987
Kerala MLAs 2001–2006
Indian National Congress politicians from Kerala
Kerala Congress (B) politicians
Indian politicians convicted of crimes
Kerala Congress politicians
Deaths from the COVID-19 pandemic in India